"Allerseelen" ("All Souls' Day") is an art song for voice and piano composed by Richard Strauss in 1885, setting a poem by the Austrian poet Hermann von Gilm from his collection  (Last Pages). It is the last in a collection of eight songs which were all settings of Gilm poems from the same volume entitled  (Eight Songs from Last Pages),  the first collection of songs Strauss ever published as Op. 10 in 1885, including also "Zueignung" (Dedication) and "Die Nacht" (The Night). The song was orchestrated in 1932 by German conductor Robert Heger.

Composition history 

In 1882, Strauss' friend, Ludwig Thuile, introduced Strauss to the poetry of Gilm contained in the volume  (Last Pages), published in the year of the poet's death, (and the composer's birth), 1864, which contained the poem, Allerseelen. The Opus 10 songs were all intended for the tenor voice and were dedicated to the principal tenor of the Munich Court Opera, Heinrich Vogl. Gilm's poem Allerseelen was well known in Germany; Eduard Lassen had set it several years previously. Strauss completed the song on 3 October 1885, whilst at Meiningen, where he had started his first job as conductor under Hans von Bülow. The song was given its first public performance at Meiningen in a chamber concert on 5 March 1886, (along with three other Opus 10 songs ("Zueignung" ("Dedication"), "Nichts" ("Nothing"), and "Die Georgine" ("The Dahlia")), sung by the tenor Rudolf Engelhardt. Although Strauss originally conceived of the song for a tenor voice, he did perform it as accompanist to his wife, Pauline in two concerts in Brussels, on November 1896, and other concerts around Germany in 1898 and 1899. In 1921, during his US tour, he also performed it with the soprano Elena Gerhardt. Strauss conducted the song for a live radio concert recorded with Soprano Annette Brun and the Orchestra della Svizzera Italiana on 11 June 1947.

Interpretations of the poem are various. All Souls' Day, 2 November, is the day of the year when people commemorate and recall those dear to them who have died. Alan Jefferson argues that "...the singer's character is trying to take advantage of the day to revive an old love affair which, it seems, has also died." Others see it more as a supernatural encounter: either the dead lover is communicating with the person setting the table or the singer is communicating with a departed lover. Norman Del Mar, when discussing the Opus 10 collection, states that "Lastly comes the ever-popular Allerseelen... a broad effusion of Strauss' growing lyricism".

Lyrics

Orchestral arrangements

The 1932 orchestration by Heger has the following instrumentation:

 Two flutes, two oboes, two clarinets, bass clarinet, two bassoons
 Four french horns, two trumpets, one trombone
 Timpani
 One harp
 Strings

"Heger's version was acceptable to Strauss, and indeed he conducted it at his own concerts". In 1947 he made a live recording with this version.

There are instrumental arrangements for Brass band, including one by Stephen Roberts published in 2006.

References
Notes

Sources

 Getz, Christine (2003), The Lieder of Richard Strauss, Chapter 10 (pages 35–382) of The Richard Strauss Companion, Edited by Mark-Daniel Schmid, Praeger Publishers, Westport CT, . 
Norman Del Mar, Richard Strauss. A Critical Commentary on his Life and Works, Volume 3, London: Faber and Faber (2009)[1968] (second edition), .
Jefferson, Alan. (1971) The Lieder of Richard Strauss, Cassel and Company, London.  
Trenner, Franz (2003) Richard Strauss Chronik, Verlag Dr Richard Strauss Gmbh, Wien, .

Songs by Richard Strauss
1885 songs